The Mercedes Formation is a Late Cretaceous (Campanian to Maastrichtian) geologic formation of the Norte Basin in Uruguay. Fossil dinosaur eggs have been reported from the formation.

See also 
 List of dinosaur-bearing rock formations
 List of stratigraphic units with dinosaur trace fossils
 Dinosaur eggs
 List of fossiliferous stratigraphic units in Uruguay

References

Bibliography

Further reading 
 G. Faccio. 1994. Dinosaurian eggs from the Upper Cretaceous of Uruguay. In K. Carpenter, K. F. Hirsch & J. R. Horner (eds.), Dinosaur Eggs and Babies 47-55

Geologic formations of Uruguay
Upper Cretaceous Series of South America
Cretaceous Uruguay
Campanian Stage
Maastrichtian Stage of South America
Sandstone formations
Ooliferous formations
Fossiliferous stratigraphic units of South America
Paleontology in Uruguay
Formations
Formations